Claire Feuerstein was the defending champion, however she chose not to participate.

Margarita Gasparyan won the title, defeating wildcard Mathilde Johansson in the final, 6–3, 6–4.

Seeds

Main draw

Finals

Top half

Bottom half

References 
 Main draw

Open GDF Suez Seine-et-Marne - Singles